Jorge Manuel Almeida Gomes de Andrade  (born 9 April 1978) is a Portuguese football manager and former professional player who played as a central defender.

After playing two years with Porto he went on to represent Deportivo (169 official appearances in five seasons) and Juventus, appearing rarely for the latter club due to injury.

Andrade earned more than 50 caps for Portugal, representing the country in one World Cup and one European Championship and helping it finish second in Euro 2004.

Club career

Early career
Andrade made his professional debuts with hometown club C.F. Estrela da Amadora in 1997, helping it to two consecutive eighth Primeira Liga places. He immediately caught the eye, and after that was on the move north to FC Porto, being the team's most used player in the 2001–02 UEFA Champions League by playing 12 times as they reached the second group phase in the competition.

Deportivo
After Portugal's unsuccessful 2002 World Cup campaign, Andrade was acquired by Spain's Deportivo de La Coruña in a move that cost the Galician side €12 million with the possibility of being increased to €13M (goalkeeper Nuno Espírito Santo was also part of the deal, for €3M). He appeared in only 11 La Liga games in his debut season, barred by César Martín and Noureddine Naybet, but was an undisputed first-choice when healthy in the following years.

On 21 April 2004, during a Champions League semi-finals match against former team Porto, Andrade was sent off by Markus Merk for a kick on Deco. The gesture was of a friendly nature, but the referee was eluded by it, and immediately gave the defender his marching orders. He was forced to serve a one-match ban.

Juventus
Andrade signed for Juventus F.C. in summer 2007, for approximately €10 million. In a Serie A match against A.S. Roma on 23 September, he badly broke his left kneecap and missed the rest of the 2007–08 season.

In the team's 2008 pre-season, Andrade suffered the same injury and missed the entire 2008–09. In a press release dated 7 August, Juventus stated:"On 9 July 2008, during a training session at Pinzolo, the player Jorge Manuel Almeida Gomes de Andrade was the victim of another serious injury to his left knee (relapse of the fracture of the rotula) operated twice in the past season. A new osteosynthesis operation was thus needed, with the post-surgery prognosis being a number of months.

Given the impossibility for the player to recover to play professionally, the company has proceeded to fully write down the residual book value of the player's registration rights with a negative effect on the 2007–08 financial year for €6.8 million." That was the third in a year and the fourth left knee surgery Andrade had in his career. The Turin-based club wrote off his salary as well as part of the transfer fee for the fiscal year, though he stated he hoped to return playing at the highest level.

On 8 April 2009, Juventus and Andrade reached an agreement and the player's remaining contract was cancelled, leaving him free to find another team. After being released he went on trial with Málaga CF, but was not offered a deal eventually; in early February 2010, he was scheduled to undergo a trial with Toronto FC in Canada, but failed to report.

International career
Andrade made his debut for Portugal on 25 April 2001, playing the full 90 minutes in a 0–4 friendly defeat in France, and was part of the nation's squads at the 2002 FIFA World Cup and UEFA Euro 2004, eventually scoring three goals in 51 games. In the latter competition, played on home soil, he also put one in his own net in a 2–1 win against the Netherlands in the semi-finals.

Andrade missed Portugal's fourth-place finish at the 2006 FIFA World Cup, having had knee surgery in March that year. He appeared in five matches during the Euro 2008 qualifying campaign, his last international occurring on 22 August when he started in a 1–1 draw in Armenia.

Managerial career
On 9 April 2015, Andrade was named assistant to Pedro Hipólito at hometown club Atlético Clube de Portugal, then struggling in the Segunda Liga. The following 21 February he was interim manager for the match away to FC Porto B, losing by a single goal.

Andrade took his first outright job on 21 March 2016 at fellow capital team Clube Oriental de Lisboa, occupying a precarious position in the same league. In May, four of his players were investigated for allegedly taking bribes to throw games, and the campaign ended with relegation.

In February 2019, Andrade was appointed assistant to Sandro Mendes at Vitória de Setúbal. He stood down in August, for family reasons.

Personal life
Andrade, along with fellow Portuguese internationals Miguel, Nani and Nélson, had descent from the Cape Verde islands, previously a Portuguese colony. He visited the archipelago in 2006, and did some work with grassroots football during his stay.

Career statistics

Club
Sources:

International
Source:

International goals

|}

Honours

Club
Porto
Taça de Portugal: 2000–01
Supertaça Cândido de Oliveira: 2001; Runner-up 2000

Deportivo
Supercopa de España: 2002

International
Portugal
UEFA European Championship runner-up: 2004

Orders
 Medal of Merit, Order of the Immaculate Conception of Vila Viçosa (House of Braganza)

References

External links

1978 births
Living people
Portuguese sportspeople of Cape Verdean descent
Footballers from Lisbon
Black Portuguese sportspeople
Portuguese footballers
Association football defenders
Primeira Liga players
C.F. Estrela da Amadora players
FC Porto players
La Liga players
Deportivo de La Coruña players
Serie A players
Juventus F.C. players
Portugal under-21 international footballers
Portugal international footballers
2002 FIFA World Cup players
UEFA Euro 2004 players
Portuguese expatriate footballers
Expatriate footballers in Spain
Expatriate footballers in Italy
Portuguese expatriate sportspeople in Spain
Portuguese expatriate sportspeople in Italy
Portuguese football managers
Liga Portugal 2 managers
Atlético Clube de Portugal managers